The Beat Bank Branch Canal was an abortive canal near Manchester, England. It was to leave the Stockport Branch Canal in South Reddish and it was to be lock free but with a short tunnel. It was to follow the contour above the right bank of the River Tame, firstly in a northerly direction and then easterly as it followed the meandering course of the river upstream. It was to terminate at or near to the coalmining hamlet of Beat Bank in Denton where it could also secure supplies of coal from nearby mines at Haughton Green.

History
The Stockport Branch Canal and the Beat Bank Branch Canal were both authorised by an Act of Parliament obtained by the Proprietors of the Ashton Canal in March 1793, just nine months after the Act which authorised the main line of the canal. This second Act also authorised the Hollinwood Branch Canal, and allowed the Proprietors to raise £30,000 to fund the construction of all three branches. The Hollingwood branch opened in late 1796, and the Stockport branch followed in January 1797. Construction of the Beat Bank branch was difficult, as it was on a clay slope at the edge of the Tame Valley, which was liable to slippage, and once the Ashton Canal Company had secured an adequate coal-carrying business on the Hollinwood Branch Canal and the Fairbottom Branch Canal, they decided to suspend all work on the unfinished Beat Bank Branch Canal. They informed William Hulton, the owner of the coal mines at Denton, that they could not afford to complete the work.

An Act of Parliament obtained in 1798 allowed the Canal Company to raise further money and abandon the unfinished canal. Its progress through Parliament was opposed by Hulton, who declined an initial offer of the unfinished canal, but he was unsuccessful in his opposition. Some of the money raised was used to pay compensation to land and property owners along the line of the canal for loss or damage caused by the activities of the Canal Company.

Route
Only a very short length of the canal was put in water at Reddish and this was known as the Beat Bank or Reddish Private Branch.
Just beyond the watered section, the plans showed a  tunnel, but construction of this was not started.

Sections of this canal still remain along Reddish Vale Allotments, to the right of Ross Lave Lane and past the M60 viaduct. The engineers who built the M60 viaduct used the same contours as those who built the Beat Bank branch canal and subsequently severed it.

By 1893, only about half of it was left, and by 1907, an engineering works had been built beside the railway, and the remains of the canal are shown as little more than a widening of the main line at the location of the former junction.

Points of interest

See also

 Canals of the United Kingdom
 History of the British canal system

Bibliography

References

Canals in the Metropolitan Borough of Stockport
Canals in Tameside